Helicopters, NATO/ASCC names:

See also
 NATO reporting name

helicopters